The acronym XPG can refer to the following:

 Paris Gare du Nord, railway station, IATA airport code.
 X/Open Portability Guide, which specifies the requirements for any system which is intended to be a Unix system, and a predecessor to the POSIX standard
 Xeroderma pigmentosum, complementation group G, a genetic disorder and a possible source of skin tumors
 an endonuclease involved in nucleotide excision repair
 XPG ("Xtreme Performance Gear"), the gaming hardware and accessories product line of the Taiwanese memory and storage manufacturer ADATA